The 2023 NCAA National Collegiate women's ice hockey tournament was a single-elimination tournament by eleven schools to determine the national champion of women's NCAA Division I college ice hockey. This is the second year the tournament features an expanded field of 11 teams. The first round and quarterfinals were played on the campuses of seeded teams on March 9 and 11, 2023, while the Frozen Four will be played on March 17 and 19, 2023 at AMSOIL Arena in Duluth, Minnesota. The Wisconsin Badgers defeated the Ohio State Buckeyes 1–0 to win their 7th national championship.

Qualifying teams 
In the second year under this qualification format, the winners of all five Division I conference tournaments received automatic berths to the NCAA tournament. This is the first year the NEWHA will receive an automatic bid. The other six teams will be selected at-large. The top five teams are then seeded.

Bids by state 

<noinclude>

Bracket 
Note: each * denotes one overtime period

Results

First Round

Penn State vs. Quinnipiac

LIU vs. Wisconsin

Clarkson vs. Minnesota Duluth

Quarterfinals

Wisconsin vs. (3) Colgate

Minnesota Duluth vs. (2) Minnesota

(5) Northeastern vs. (4) Yale

Quinnipiac vs. (1) Ohio State

Semifinals

(5) Northeastern vs. (1) Ohio State

Wisconsin vs. (2) Minnesota

Championship

Wisconsin vs. (1) Ohio State

See also 
 NCAA Women's Ice Hockey Tournament
 2023 NCAA Division I men's ice hockey tournament

References 

NCAA Women's Ice Hockey Tournament
1